Nikita Leonidovich Belousov (born 26 February 2002) is a Russian football player. He plays as a defensive midfielder for FC Ufa.

Club career
He made his debut in the Russian Premier League for FC Ufa on 22 July 2020 in a game against FC Arsenal Tula, as a starter.

On 17 June 2021, he joined FC Shinnik Yaroslavl on loan. His Shinnik loan was terminated on 16 August 2021, and he joined his hometown team FC Spartak Tuymazy on loan instead.

References

External links
 
 
 

2002 births
People from Bashkortostan
Living people
Russian footballers
Association football midfielders
FC Ufa players
FC Shinnik Yaroslavl players
FC Irtysh Omsk players
Russian Premier League players
Russian Second League players
Sportspeople from Bashkortostan